Suffolk Gold cheese is a semi-soft cheese prepared from the pasteurised cow's milk of Guernsey cattle. Suffolk Farmhouse Cheeses, a family-operated company located in Creeting St Mary, Suffolk, England, produces the cheese. The dairy was established in 2004.

Properties
The cheese is aged for ten to twelve weeks, and has a buttery flavour and creamy texture. Suffolk Gold is produced in rounds that weigh 3 kilograms (6.5 pounds).

As an ingredient
Suffolk Gold cheese is used as an ingredient in Fairfields Farm Crisps, a potato crisp product produced in Colchester, Essex, England.

Awards
Suffolk Farmhouse Cheeses received the BALE agricultural award from the Suffolk Agricultural Association in 2013.

See also
 List of British cheeses
 List of cheeses

References

External links
 

Cow's-milk cheeses
English cheeses